Beaver Creek is a stream in Renville County, in the U.S. state of Minnesota. It is a tributary of the Minnesota River.

Beaver Creek is an English translation of the native Sioux language name.

See also
List of rivers of Minnesota

References

Rivers of Renville County, Minnesota
Rivers of Minnesota